Ashley A. Woods (born October 15, 1985) is a comic book artist from Chicago, Illinois, known for her work on the Tomb Raider, Niobe, and Ladycastle series.

Early life
Woods was born and raised in Chicago, Illinois and developed an interest in anime, movies, comics and video games at a young age. Her favorite character was Sailor Moon, along with video games like Final Fantasy, Resident Evil, Pandemonium!, Super Mario World, Sonic the Hedgehog and Mega Man. 

She decided to pursue an art education when she was 15 and attended the International Academy of Design and Technology, receiving her degree in Film and Animation in 2007. After graduation, she presented her work in gallery shows across the States and Kyoto University in Kyoto, Japan before deciding to leverage contacts she'd made on the comic-con exhibit circuit and at local gatherings of industry professionals.

Career 
Inspired by blending military and fantasy themes, Woods created, wrote, and fully illustrated her action-fantasy comic, "Millennia War", during her senior year of high school and freshman year of college and self-published the first issue of the series in March 2006. The series currently has seven issues and a graphic novel." 

In 2015, her piece, "Family Portrait", was the opening work in APB: Artists Against Police Brutality, a crowdfunded comic book anthology that benefited the Innocence Project. Her first professional work came in 2015, when she began working with Sebastian A. Jones and Amandla Stenberg on the series Niobe: She is Life after meeting them at the Black Comic Arts Festival in San Francisco, California six months earlier.

In 2016, she illustrated the four-issue limited series Ladycastle for Boom! Studios. Published over the first half of 2017, the series brought her popular attention, leading SyFy to call Woods a "breakout artist".

Dark Horse Comics hired Woods to pencil the four-issue limited series Tomb Raider: Survivor's Crusade, published November 2017 through February 2018.

She next provided cover work for the Image Comics title Bitter Root, Excellence (Skybound & Image Comics), Marvel's Shuri from Black Panther, and interiors for the Viking comic Heathen, with Vault Comics, which also has a movie in the works. She then expanded to television and worked on the Jordan Peele and J. J. Abrams-produced TV show, Lovecraft Country, based on the drama/horror novel by writer Matt Ruff. Her latest work can be seen in the upcoming 
Jupiter Invincible with Pulitzer Prize winning author Yusef Komunyakaa which premieres at the Tribeca Film Festival June 2021 and Wonder Woman Black & Gold for DC Comics July 2021.

Bibliography
 Millennia War #0-6 (Creator, Artist, and Writer) (2006-2009)
 Niobe: She is Life #1-4 with writers Sebastian Jones and Amandla Stenberg (2015-2016)
 Black #1 (Cover) (2016)
 Eraathun #2 (Cover) (2016)
 Lady Castle #1-3 with writer Delilah S. Dawson  (January - May 2017)
 Tomb Raider: Survivor's Crusade #1-#4 (November 2017 - February 2018)
 BLACK COMIX RETURNS (Cover) (2018)
 Bitter Root (Cover) (2018)
 WHITE #1 (Cover) (2019)
 EXCELLENCE (Cover) (2019)
 MARVEL Action Black Panther #5 (Cover) (2019)
 HEATHEN #9 (Cover) (2019-2020)
 HEATHEN #9-12 (Interiors) (2019-2020)
 Lovecraft Country (TV Show) (2020)
 Jupiter Invincible (Cover & Interiors) (2021)
 Wonder Woman Black & Gold (Interiors) (2021)

References

External links
 
 
 Lady Castle interview at Comics Alliance 
 Lady Castle interview at SyFy
 Tomb Raider interview at Pete's Basement
 Review of Woods' work on Tomb Raider at Multiversity Comics
 Review of Woods' work on Tomb Raider at Comics Beat

Living people
Artists from Chicago
American female comics artists
1985 births